Toh Kai Wei (born 21 August 1996) is a Singaporean netball player who represents Singapore internationally and plays in the positions of goal attack, goal shooter or wing attack. She was part of the Singaporean squad at the 2019 Netball World Cup, which was also her first World Cup appearance. 

In September 2019, she was included in the Singaporean squad for the 2019 M1 Nations Cup.

References 

1996 births
Living people
Singaporean netball players
Southeast Asian Games medalists in netball
Southeast Asian Games silver medalists for Singapore
Competitors at the 2019 Southeast Asian Games
2019 Netball World Cup players
Singaporean sportspeople of Chinese descent
21st-century Singaporean women